The Association of Trade Unions (ZZZ) was a national trade union federation in Poland.

The federation was founded in 1945.  It claimed 4,000,000 members by 1956, and 12,000,000 in 1980.  It was closely linked with the Polish United Workers' Party, although temporarily achieved some autonomy in 1956.

In 1980, Solidarity was established as an independent trade union.  It proved highly popular; the ZZZ lost most of its membership, and was dissolved in December.  Its assets were later passed to the new All-Poland Alliance of Trade Unions.

Affiliates
In 1956, the following unions were affiliates:

 Agricultural and Forestry Workers' Trade Union
 Chemical Industry Workers' Trade Union
 Communal Economy Employees' Trade Union
 Communication Workers' Trade Union
 Construction, Ceramics and Allied Trade Workers' Union
 Cultural Workers' Trade Union
 Electrical Power Workers' Trade Union
 Food Industry Workers' Trade Union
 Foundry Industry Workers' Trade Union
 Health Service Workers' Trade Union
 Metal Workers' Trade Union
 Miners' Trade Union
 Railway Workers' Trade Union
 Road and Air Transport Workers' Trade Union
 Shipping Workers' Trade Union
 State and Public Workers' Trade Union
 Textile, Clothing and Leather Industry Workers' Trade Union
 Wood Products and Local Industry Workers' Trade Union
 Trade Workers' Trade Union

Presidents
1945: Kazimierz Witaszewski
1948: Edward Ochab
1949: Aleksander Zawadzki
1950: Wiktor Kłosiewicz
1956: Ignacy Loga-Sowiński
1971: Władysław Kruczek
1980: Jan Szydlak
1980: Romuald Jankowski

References

National trade union centers of Poland
Trade unions established in 1945
Trade unions disestablished in 1980